James Anthony Neilson (November 28, 1941 – November 6, 2020) was a Canadian professional ice hockey defenceman who played in the National Hockey League (NHL) for the New York Rangers, California Golden Seals, and Cleveland Barons and completed his career with the Edmonton Oilers in the World Hockey Association (WHA).

Early life 
Neilson was born in Big River, Saskatchewan in 1941. As a child his mother abandoned the family, so Neilson and his two sisters grew up in St. Patrick’s Orphanage in Prince Albert.

Career 
Neilson played a total of 1,024 games in the NHL, with 69 goals and 299 assists. He played from 1962–63 season to 1977–78 season in the NHL and 1978–79 in the WHA. He was a four time all-star. 

In the 2009 book 100 Ranger Greats, the authors ranked Neilson at #42 all-time of the 901 New York Rangers who had played during the team's first 82 seasons. 

Neilson was inducted into the Saskatchewan Sports Hall of Fame in 2018. Neilson died in Winnipeg on November 6, 2020.

Career statistics

Regular season and playoffs

See also
 List of NHL players with 1,000 games played

References

External links
 

1941 births
2020 deaths
California Golden Seals players
Canadian ice hockey defencemen
Cleveland Barons (NHL) players
Edmonton Oilers (WHA) players
First Nations sportspeople
Ice hockey people from Saskatchewan
Kitchener Beavers (EPHL) players
New York Rangers players
Prince Albert Mintos players